Strawberry mild yellow-edge virus (SMYEV) is a pathogenic plant virus.

Transmission 
The virus is transmitted by aphid species in the genus Chaetosiphon, mainly C. fragaefolii, C. thomasi, C. thomasi jacobi. The virus cannot be transmitted through seeds, contact, grafting, or pollen. It is also a vector for the strawberry yellow edge-associated potexvirus.

Host and symptoms 
Symptoms of this virus mainly include cupped leaflets and reduced in Fragaria species. In some plants such as Fragaria chiloensis and Fragaria × ananassa infection appears symptomless.

Susceptible hosts 
The susceptible host species are mainly in the families Rosaceae and Rutaceae.
 Citrus aurantium
 Duchesnea indica
 Fragaria chiloensis
 Fragaria vesca
 Fragaria virginiana
 Fragaria × ananassa
 Sanguisorba minor

See also 
 List of strawberry diseases

References

External links 
 ICTVdB - The Universal Virus Database: Strawberry mild yellow-edge virus
 Family Groups - The Baltimore Method

Viral strawberry diseases